The Robe is the second EP released by the melodic hard rock band Ten. The compact disc was officially released only in Asian markets. It was released on September 18, 1997.

Track listing
All songs written by Gary Hughes except where noted.
 "The Robe" (EP version) – 6:15
 "Warpath" – 3:50
 "Venus and Mars" – 4:35
 "Give Me a Piece of Your Heart" – 5:42 (Hughes/Vinny Burns)
 "The Robe" (Karaoke version) – 5:31

All tracks were previously unreleased.
Tracks 1 and 5, original version on the album The Robe.

Personnel
Gary Hughes – vocals
Vinny Burns – Lead guitars
John Halliwell – Rhythm guitars
Ged Rylands – keyboards
Greg Morgan – drums

Production
Mixing – Mike Stone
Engineer – Ray Brophy
Drums recorded by Mike Stone

See also
The Robe novel and movie

External links
 https://web.archive.org/web/20010430233542/http://www.usiwakamaru.or.jp/~oct-23/page/tencd.html

References 

Ten (band) albums
1997 EPs
Albums produced by Gary Hughes